The Acca Larentia massacre was the journalistic name given to a double homicide that occurred in Rome on 7 January 1978. Five teenagers of the youth wing of the Italian Social Movement were ambushed while leaving the local party headquarters, and two of the teens (13 years old and 17 years old) were killed. The killings caused riots that same day, in which another MSI sympathiser was killed in clashes with police.

The attack was perpetrated by members of militant far-left groups, though the culprits were never identified.

Events
Five members of the Italian Social Movement were fired upon with automatic weapons by a group of five or six assailants while they were leaving the local party headquarters in Via Acca Larenzia to distribute pamphlets. Franco Bigonzetti and Francesco Ciavatta were killed, while Vincenzo Segneri, although wounded, managed to return to the party headquarters with Maurizio Lupini and Giuseppe D'Audino, both of whom were unharmed.

Riots broke out later on the same day between the police and a crowd of MSI activists that had gathered at the site. Nineteen-year old Stefano Recchioni was fatally injured by a stray bullet and several others, including Youth Front national secretary Gianfranco Fini, were wounded by tear gas canisters. Carabinieri officer Edoardo Sivori was suspected of killing Recchioni but was never charged.

Aftermath
The attack was claimed by a self-described "Armed Nuclei for Territorial Counterpower". Five members of far-left group Lotta Continua were charged with the murders in 1987 but subsequently acquitted of all charges.

A Škorpion submachine gun, proven by ballistics to having been used in the attack, was found in 1988 in a Red Brigades safehouse in Milan.

The killings further polarised Italian politics during the Years of Lead and led to a fracture within the neo-fascist movement, with more radical militants blaming the party leadership for its failure to denounce the police for Recchioni's death and choosing to join emerging extremist groups like the Armed Revolutionary Nuclei.

Singer and songwriter Fabrizio Marzi dedicated the song Giovinezza ("Youth") to Stefano Recchioni in 1979.

Riots broke out during commemorations of the victims on 10 January 1979, with seventeen-year old Alberto Giaquinto being fatally injured by police officer Alessio Speranza, who was subsequently acquitted of all charges.

In 2013, then-mayor of Rome and former MSI member Gianni Alemanno named a street of the city after three victims.

Filmography 
 Rhythm 'n Blood, a film by Kaspar Hauser, was released in 2008.

See also 
 2013 Neo Irakleio Golden Dawn office shooting
 List of unsolved murders
 Mikis Mantakas
 Primavalle fire
 Sergio Ramelli

References

Sources 
 Andrea Colombo, Storia Nera, Bologna La verità di Francesca Mambro e Valerio Fioravanti, Cairo editore, 2007, 
 Luca Telese, Cuori Neri. Dal rogo di Primavalle alla morte di Ramelli, 2006, 
 Massimiliano Morelli, Acca Larentia-Asfalto nero sangue, 2008, 

1970s in Rome
1978 murders in Italy
Deaths by firearm in Italy
Deaths related to the Years of Lead (Italy)
Far-left terrorism
Italian neo-fascism
Terrorist incidents in Italy in 1978
Unsolved murders in Italy
Years of Lead (Italy)